Halah, as an Arabic name is female. It is also a Hebrew name.

Halah as a given name or a surname can be associated with:
Halah binte Wahab, one of Abd al-Muttalib ibn Hashim's wives
Halah bint Khuwailid, the sister of Muhammad's first wife

Other uses:
Halah, the city
"Halah", a single by Mazzy Star from their first album She Hangs Brightly

See also 
 Hala (given name)
 Arabic name

External links
https://web.archive.org/web/20060509233721/http://pregnancyandbaby.com/baby_names/Girls/H/Halah.html
http://www.infoplease.com/ce6/society/A0822393.html